Gran Valencia  Fútbol Club is a Venezuelan football club based in Valencia

References

External links
 Official website

Football clubs in Venezuela
Association football clubs established in 2011
2014 establishments in Venezuela